Abdur Rouf Talukder is a senior Bangladeshi government official who has served as the Governor of Bangladesh Bank since July 2022. Prior to becoming Governor he served as the Senior Secretary of the Ministry of Finance. He previously served as a director of Biman Bangladesh Airlines.

Early life 
Talukder was born on 15 August 1964 in Sirajganj District, Present day Bangladesh.

Education
He completed his Master's in Business Administration from the Institute of Business Administration of the University of Dhaka. He has a second master's degree in development studies from the University of Birmingham.

In addition, he attended a number of professional training courses at Harvard Kennedy School of Government, Boston, USA; IMF Institute, Washington DC, USA; Crown Agents Training & Professional Development Center, London, UK; Institute of Public Finance (IPF), Dhaka, etc.

He is married to Selina Rawshan and has two children.

Career 
Talukder joined the Bangladesh Civil Service in 1985. He was a member of Bangladesh Civil Service Administration Cadre.

In October 2017, Talukder was appointed the additional secretary of budget and macroeconomics in the Finance Division of the Ministry of Finance.

Talukder was appointed the acting secretary of the Ministry of Finance on 16 July 2018. He replaced Mohammad Muslim Chowdhury.

At a conference organised by Bangladesh Institute of Development Studies, he blamed the Ministry of Health for failing to spend their budget during the COVID-19 pandemic in Bangladesh. He received the FY 2020-21 Integrity Award from the government of Bangladesh. On 21 September 2021, he was promoted to the rank of senior secretary.

Talukder served as a director of Bangladesh Foreign Trade Institute and Bangladesh Public Administration Training Centre. He was part of a delegation led by Salman F. Rahman to the World Bank. He is a director of Hotels International Limited.
He worked in wide range of government positions in his long illustrious career but his specialization in public finance and economic management has brought him back to Finance Division at almost every rank of his career. He worked more than 18 years in Finance Division before elevating to the position of Finance Secretary on 17 July 2018.
 
Apart from his long career in Finance Division, Mr. Talukder has served in Ministry of Industries, Ministry of Food, and Ministry of Information. He also worked at Bangladesh High Commission, Kuala Lumpur as First Secretary (Commercial).
 
In Finance Division, he has contributed in important areas like budget reform, macroeconomic management and introduction of IT in PFM. He was instrumental in implementing Medium Term Budget Framework (MTBF) and new Budget and Accounting Classification System (BACS). He played the key role in introduction of payroll automation for the government employees, EFT for pensioners and automation of National Saving Certificates. He is one of the key contributors in drafting the Public Money and Budget management Act, 2009 and Autonomous Bodies’ Surplus Revenue Act. 2020.

On 11 June 2022, government appointed Talukder as the Governor of Bangladesh Bank.

References 

Living people
University of Dhaka alumni
People from Sirajganj District
1964 births
Governors of Bangladesh Bank